The Orsodacnidae are a small family of leaf beetles, previously included as a subfamily within the Chrysomelidae. It is the smallest of the Chrysomeloid families in North America; Oxypeltidae is smaller, with only three species in South America. A fossil species of Aulacoscelis is known from the Early Cretaceous (Aptian-Albian) Santana Group of Brazil.

Genera
 Aulacoscelis
 Janbechynea
 Orsodacne

References

 
Beetle families